Bruce Jarchow (born May 19, 1948) is an American film, television and stage actor. He began his career in Chicago as a member of The Second City Mainstage. He received the 1981 Joseph Jefferson Award for Actor in a Revue for "Well, I'm Off to the Thirty Years' War". His notable roles include Lyle Ferguson in the film Ghost, Dr. Mascelli in Outbreak, and Principal Scampi in the television series Weird Science.  

His television appearances include recurring roles in Seinfeld, Parks and Recreation, Desperate Housewives, Work in Progress (TV series), ER (TV series), Honey, I Shrunk the Kids: The TV Show, The Norm Show, What About Joan and According to Jim.

He is also featured in the films The Weather Man, Stranger than Fiction (2006 film) , Somewhere in Time,  Continental Divide, The Puppet Masters, Big (film) and Music from Another Room.

Filmography

External links
 

1948 births
American male film actors
American male television actors
Male actors from Evanston, Illinois
20th-century American male actors
21st-century American male actors
Living people
North Shore Country Day School alumni